Edith Hume (1843–1906) was a British painter and illustrator.

She was born Edith Dunn and married the painter Thomas O. Hume. She was active in the Netherlands during the years 1878–1906, creating beach scenes of Dutch fisher folk in Katwijk and Scheveningen as a follower of the Hague School.

Edith's brother, Henry Treffry Dunn, was a studio assistant to Dante Gabriel Rossetti.

References

External links

 
 Edith Hume on artnet

1843 births
1906 deaths
19th-century English painters
20th-century English painters
20th-century English women artists
19th-century English women artists
British expatriates in the Netherlands
British women illustrators
English women painters
Hague School